Vladimir Potekin (born 10 December 1875, date of death unknown) was a sports shooter from the Russian Empire. He competed in two events at the 1912 Summer Olympics.

References

1875 births
Year of death missing
Male sport shooters from the Russian Empire
Olympic shooters for the Russian Empire
Shooters at the 1912 Summer Olympics
Place of birth missing